Nanogalathea raymondi is a species of squat lobster from the Bay of Bengal. It is the only species in the genus Nanogalathea. It can be distinguished from other squat lobsters by the lack of any teeth along the edge of the rostrum. The specific epithet raymondi commemorates the carcinologist Raymond B. Manning.

References

External links

Squat lobsters
Monotypic crustacean genera